Bukovany is a municipality and village in Benešov District in the Central Bohemian Region of the Czech Republic. It has about 800 inhabitants.

History
The first written mention of Bukovany is from 1318.

Gallery

References

Villages in Benešov District